Annie Bridget McCarrick (born March 21, 1966) is an American woman from Long Island, New York who went missing under suspicious circumstances on March 26, 1993, while she was residing in Ireland.

Disappearance
McCarrick was born on Long Island, New York and she lived there until her move to Ireland in January 1987. McCarrick disappeared on March 26, 1993. She had left her apartment in Dublin, Ireland so that she could go to the Wicklow Mountains for the day. She had asked a friend to accompany her, but her friend declined. CCTV captured images of McCarrick in the Allied Irish Bank location in Sandymount, where she was seen withdrawing money from her bank account. She did some shopping at Quinnsworth supermarket before returning to her apartment at 3:00pm. She was seen on a bus at about 3:40pm in Ranelagh heading toward Enniskerry. Some time later that evening between 8pm and 10pm, the doorman at Johnnie Fox's pub in Glencullen claims to have seen McCarrick at the pub accompanied by a young man who was wearing a wax jacket. Allegedly, McCarrick had gone to see an Irish music and dancing show that was a traditional event called the Hooley Show, but did not realise that there was a cover charge. McCarrick's male friend then paid for her and accompanied her in to watch the show. Nobody saw either McCarrick or her male friend leave the pub, and the man's identity has never been discovered. However, this sighting at Johnnie Fox's has been disputed over the years. As it was dark and wet outside that night, it seems unlikely that McCarrick would have walked all the way from Enniskerry to Glencullen, which was 6 km away.

Investigation and aftermath
Numerous searches by authorities in Ireland have turned up nothing in McCarrick's disappearance. The authorities focused their search on the Wicklow Mountains and wider Leinster area as many women have gone missing there since 1990. Gardaí believe that McCarrick may have been murdered by the same serial killer involved in the other disappearances. In 2008 the case was reopened. In 2014, in a new book called Missing, Presumed by a detective named Sergeant Alan Bailey, it was revealed that an IRA killer and child abuser was established as a "credible suspect" in the disappearance of McCarrick. In July 2020, a New York-based lawyer named Michael Griffith announced that he had received a significant new lead in relation to the Annie McCarrick case. In September 2020, a U.S-based team of private investigators announced that they had identified the suspect whom they believe murdered Annie McCarrick. The investigative team believes that McCarrick never actually made it to Johnnie Fox's pub and that the alleged sighting at the pub was a case of mistaken identity. Instead, the team believes that McCarrick went missing some time after arriving in Enniskerry. Michael Griffith stated that the pieces of the puzzle were slowly coming together. Recently, it has come to light that a woman named Margaret Wogan spotted a woman matching the description of Annie McCarrick, in Poppies cafe in Enniskerry on the Friday afternoon that she went missing. According to Wogan, McCarrick was accompanied by a man with a "square face". Private investigators now believe that this is a vital piece of information in the McCarrick case. Michael Griffith has stated that the new lead they are working on involves someone whom McCarrick may have dated. In February 2023, Spanish television channel La Sexta aired a three-part documentary "Anglés: Historia de una fuga" claiming that the notorious criminal Antonio Anglés might have been responsible for her disappearance.

See also
List of people who disappeared

References

1966 births
1990s missing person cases
American expatriates in the Republic of Ireland
Missing people
Missing person cases in Ireland
People from Long Island
Unsolved crimes in Ireland